

1970 

 January 18 – A Skukuza post office clerk, Marius Meyer, is caught by a crocodile at a Sabie River fishing spot near Skukuza. His remains were never found.
 July 10 – A train hits a herd of buffaloes on the Selati railway line near Bume, killing 19 animals.

1971 
 January 9 – The new Engelhard Dam near Letaba Rest Camp spills over for the first time.
 February 19 - A Midas free-tailed bat, Tadarida (Mops) midas midas, is caught near Skukuza. This species has not previously been recorded in South Africa.
 May 17 – Black rhinos reintroduced to the Park. Twenty of these animals were released between Skukuza and Pretoriuskop.
 September - An anthrax epidemic breaks out in the northern areas of the Park, nearly wiping out the already small roan antelope population.

1972 
 September 21 - A further twelve black rhinos from the Zambezi valley in Rhodesia arrive in the Park.

1973 
 March 21 - Paul Kruger Gate near Skukuza opens.
 October 23 – A new frog species, the knocking sand frog, sometimes also known as the sandveld pyxie (Tomopterna krugerensis) is discovered around the Machayi and Mathlakuza Pans in the northeastern part of the Park near the Mozambican frontier.

1974 
 November 1 - Mooiplaas ranger post, close to the later Mopani rest camp, opens with Bruce Bryden as the first ranger stationed there.

1975 
 March - Actors Roger Moore and Lee Marvin start location shooting for Shout at the Devil (film) near Letaba Rest Camp.

1976 
 February 27 - The last Mozambican recruits cross the border at Pafuri. The northern Kruger National Park was one of the main routes used by the Witwatersrand Native Labour Association (WNLA) to move black recruits from Mozambique to the Witwatersrand gold mines.
 March - The new Frelimo government close the border between Mozambique and the Park, including the Pafuri Border Post.
 September 16 - The memorial bust of President Paul Kruger, sculpted by Coert Steynberg, officially unveiled at the Paul Kruger Gate near Skukuza.

1977 
 February – Cyclone Emilie causes damage to various dams, including the Engelhard and Kanniedood, in the northern region of the Park.

1978 
 July – Wolhuter, the first wilderness trail, opens near Malelane in the south of the park.

1979 
 August 13 - The first sighting of Yellowbilled Oxpeckers Buphagus africanus in the Park was made along the Mphongolo River north of Shingwedzi. The species disappeared from the Transvaal Lowveld soon after the 1896/97 rinderpest epidemic. Before 1979 the closest population occurred in Rhodesia's Gonarezhou National Park, but regular dipping of cattle in the corridor between Gonarezhou and Kruger prevented the migration of the birds to Kruger due to their sensitivity to poisoned ticks. Due to the Rhodesian Bush War, there was a general breakdown of veterinary services in this corridor after 1977 and presumably facilitated the migration of the birds to the Kruger National Park.
 November – The Olifants Trail opens.

See also
History of the Kruger National Park
The Kruger National Park in the 1950s
The Kruger National Park in the 1960s
The Kruger National Park in the 1980s

References

Kruger National Park